The Someșul Mic (Little Someș, Hungarian: Kis-Szamos) is a river in north-western Romania (Cluj County). At its confluence with the Someșul Mare in Mica, the Someș is formed. It is formed at the confluence of two headwaters, Someșul Cald ("Warm Someș") and Someșul Rece ("Cold Someș"), that originate in the Apuseni Mountains. From the confluence, in Gilău, the Someșul Mic flows east and north through Cluj-Napoca, Apahida and Gherla, until it meets the Someșul Mare in Dej.

Towns and villages

The following towns and villages are situated along the river Someșul Mic, from source to mouth: Gilău, Luna de Sus, Florești, Gârbău, Cluj-Napoca, Sânnicoară, Apahida, Jucu de Mijloc, Jucu de Sus, Răscruci, Bonțida, Fundătura, Iclozel, Livada, Hășdate, Gherla, Mintiu Gherlii, Petrești, Salatiu, Mănăstirea, Mica.

Tributaries

The following rivers are tributaries to the river Someșul Mic:

Left: Someșul Cald, Căpuș, Nadăș, Pârâul Chintenilor, Valea Caldă, Feiurdeni, Borșa, Lonea, Lujerdiu, Valea Mărului, Orman, Nima, Pârâul Ocnei
Right: Someșul Rece, Feneș, Gârbău, Becaș, Zăpodie, Mărăloiu, Gădălin, Fizeș, Bandău

References

Rivers of Romania
 
Rivers of Cluj County
Geography of Transylvania